Molokai Light, also known as U.S. Coast Guard Molokai Light, is a lighthouse in Kalawao County, Hawaii, on the island of Molokai. It was built in 1909 and was listed on the National Register of Historic Places in 1982.

References

External links

Lighthouses completed in 1909
Lighthouses on the National Register of Historic Places in Hawaii
Historic American Buildings Survey in Hawaii
National Register of Historic Places in Kalawao County, Hawaii
Hawaii Register of Historic Places